Il commissario Manara (Commissioner Manara) is an Italian detective television series. It is a spin-off of Una famiglia in giallo, and like that show, is a romantic comedy and a police procedural. Guido Caprino plays the titular commissioner Luca Manara.

The series consists of two seasons of twelve episodes: the first was broadcast from 8 January to 12 February 2009 on Rai 1, while the second aired from 3 March 2011 on the same network. A third series, of which the subject had already been laid out, was not completed.

Production 
The show is a spin-off of the 2005 television series Una famiglia in giallo, in which the actor Guido Caprino, interpreter of Luca Manara, appeared in a secondary role in the 5th episode entitled "Biscotti al Veleno". For the new series that saw him as the protagonist, Caprino claimed to have been inspired by Frank Zappa for behavioral psychology and the physiognomy to be attributed to Commissioner Manara, the actor being an admirer of the Italian-U.S. composer and guitarist.

The episodes are set in a fictional location not precisely specified between Orbetello and the Argentario promontory, but in reality the first season was filmed about 90 kilometers away, in the towns bordering Lake Bracciano (Bracciano, Trevignano Romano, Anguillara). In particular, the seat of the municipality of Trevignano Romano was transformed into the police station directed by the commissioner Luca Manara.

The second season of the series, announced in 2010, was shot in Maremma and in Rome. Filming lasted 19 weeks, from May to October 2010, for a total of 105 days.

In July 2012 the third season did not appear in RAI production plans, and the creator of the series Alberto Simone began to fear that he had now reached the epilogue, thus commenting the news on Facebook: "The new Series subject that we already had written, full of even more amusing novelties and with a gigantic twist in the life of our friendly protagonist, it will therefore remain in the production drawers". In August 2013, following the change of management of Rai Fiction (from Fabrizio Del Noce to Eleonora Andreatta), the realization of a third season was confirmed and the broadcast was scheduled for autumn 2014 on Rai 1.

In the first months of 2014, however, the series was finally definitively cancelled.

Plot 
The first season begins with the arrival of the new police commissioner (detective or inspector), Luca Manara, to the small town of the Maremma Grossetana in Tuscany. Manara, whose nonconformity shows in his yellow aviator sunglasses, his penchant for jeans and his motorcycle (a Triumph Bonneville), was transferred from Milan due to his relationship with a superior’s wife. Manara’s promiscuity and flirtatious charm continue throughout the series, often causing interoffice drama or helping to solve a case.

On the same day, Inspector Lara Rubino, played by Roberta Giarrusso, also begins work at the station. Unlike Manara, Rubino is from the area; she has just moved back and lives with her aunt Caterina Bentivoglio (who was Scarpati's mother in the series A Family in Yellow) and her German Shepherd Brigadiere, who often discover important clues. Bentivoglio is the first on the crime scene in the pilot episode.

Rubino and Manara met during training at the police academy, and their evolving relationship serves as the show’s central romance.

The two solve most of the murders, with occasional assistance from their police subordinates or from Aunt Caterina. Like many police procedurals or detective shows, each episode is devoted to a new murder case that is wrapped up by the end of the episode.

The second season begins with the marriage between the two protagonists, Luca Manara and Lara Rubino, which is interrupted by a murder. Their relationship founders, and Lara moves to Milan for an intense course of study to progress her career.

She is temporarily replaced in the police station by Marta, played by Anna Safroncik [6], a colleague with a dark past who falls in love with Manara. However, Manara still loves Rubino and at the end of the series, the couple reunites. Marta returns to Naples to the anti-Camorra team together with a colleague (initially enemy of Manara) who heads the counter-terrorism unit.

Recurring characters include: Lara's aunt, Caterina Bentivoglio and Brigadiere; the married police couple of Serena Sardi and Augusto Toscani, who are trying to get pregnant; the constables: the religious Pio Buttafuoco and the bumbling Mario Barbagallo; coroner Ginevra Rosmini, a seductive devourer of men; the superintendent Casadio, who does not appreciate Manara’s methods but must recognize his talents; and finally Ada, the owner of the farmhouse bed and breakfast where Manara lives. Bruno Gambarotta has a recurrent cameo in the role of the policeman Quattroni, who works at the station’s front desk, known for a strong Piedmontese accent.

Cast

 Guido Caprino: Luca Manara
 Roberta Giarrusso: Lara Rubino
 Valeria Valeri: Caterina Bentivoglio
 Anna Safroncik: Marta Rivera 
 Jane Alexander: Ginevra Rosmini
 Lucia Ocone: Serena Sardi
 Augusto Fornari: Augusto Toscani
 Francesco Quinn: Fabrizio Raimondi 
 Giulietta Revel: Annarita Casadio
 Daniela Morozzi: Ada
 Teresa Mannino: Teresa Manara 
 Michela Andreozzi: Tiziana Manara 
 Luca Calvani: Massimo Cenci 
 Eleonora Mazzoni: Alessandra 
 Isabelle Adriani: Agnese Mais

External links

References

Italian crime television series
2009 Italian television series debuts
2011 Italian television series endings
Television shows set in Florence
RAI original programming